Amaury Bonduel (born 3 March 1999 in Braine-l'Alleud) is a racing driver from Belgium. He is the reigning V de V Challenge Monoplace champion and has previously competed in the GP3 Series.

Racing record

Career summary

Complete GP3 Series results
(key) (Races in bold indicate pole position) (Races in italics indicate fastest lap)

References

External links
 Profile at Driver Database
 Official website

Belgian racing drivers
1999 births
Living people
French GP3 Series drivers
Italian F4 Championship drivers
People from Braine-l'Alleud
Sportspeople from Walloon Brabant

24H Series drivers
Formula Renault Eurocup drivers
JD Motorsport drivers
Trident Racing drivers
Karting World Championship drivers
Lamborghini Super Trofeo drivers